Annex or Annexe may refer to:

Places 
 The Annex, a neighbourhood in downtown Toronto, Ontario, Canada
 The Annex (New Haven), a neighborhood of New Haven, Connecticut, US
 Annex, Oregon, a census-designated place in the US

Other uses 
 Annex (comics), a Marvel Comics character
 Addendum or appendix at the end of a document
 The Annex, Grand Cayman, a football ground in George Town, Cayman Islands
 "Annex", B-side of the 1980 Orchestral Manoeuvres in the Dark single "Enola Gay"
 Annex, an early name for the Bangkok Adventist Hospital

See also
 Annexation